PRAME family member 10 is a protein that in humans is encoded by the PRAMEF10 gene.

References